"What Kinda Gone" is a song recorded by American country music singer Chris Cagle. It was released in July 2007 as the first single from his album My Life's Been a Country Song, which was released in early 2008. Having reached a peak position of number 3 on the Billboard Hot Country Songs charts in April 2008, it became Cagle's first Top 10 single since 2003's "Chicks Dig It", his eleventh chart single overall, and his final Top 10 country single. It was written by Dave Berg, Candyce Cameron and Chip Davis.

Content
The narrator's significant other tells him she’s gone, but he wonders what kind of "gone" she is talking about and he proceeds to list off the various meanings of the word.

Critical reception
Kevin John Coyne of Country Universe gave the song an American B+ grade saying that song is "packed with personality" and that he was "smiling from the first verse".

Chart performance
"What Kinda Gone" debuted at number 58 on the U.S. Billboard Hot Country Songs for the week of August 4, 2007.

Year-end charts

References

External links
Chip Davis, the co-songwriter of What Kinda Gone, chats about the song with the 2 music geeks

2007 singles
2007 songs
Chris Cagle songs
Capitol Records Nashville singles
Songs written by Dave Berg (songwriter)
Song recordings produced by Scott Hendricks